Marquis is a 1989 French-language film, produced in Belgium and France, based on the life and writings of the Marquis de Sade. All the actors wear animal masks, and their voices are dubbed. There are a few scenes involving clay animation. The film was a project by French cartoonist Roland Topor, who had previously delivered the imagery for the animated cult classic La Planète Sauvage (1973). Marquis too is considered a cult classic today.

The tagline used in the US release was, "A bizarre tale of sex, lust, and the French Revolution".

Plot
In pre-revolutionary France, the canine Marquis de Sade sits in jail working on his writing and having conversations with his penis which has a face and is named Colin. When Colin is not whining about his need for stimulation and espousing his impulsive philosophies, he is "telling stories" that make up the Marquis' work (some of which is illustrated via clay animation).

The Marquis was imprisoned for allegedly defecating on a cross, however he is also accused of raping and impregnating the bovine Justine. The latter is a plot by the camel-headed priest Don Pompero and the cocky Gaetan De Preaubois try to keep secret the fact that Justine's rapist was actually the King of France.

Meanwhile, the revolutionaries prepare to stage a coup and depose the king, under the lead of Juliette de Titane, an equine noble. Several of the inmates are also political prisoners leading to several failed escape attempts which land the inmates in the Bastille dungeon. They are eventually freed, however, by the revolutionaries.

Colin eventually falls in love with Juliette and runs away with her to continue the revolution, leaving the Marquis to continue his writing and to muse about his life in peace.

Voices

Sources

External links

1989 films
Belgian drama films
Films based on works by the Marquis de Sade
Films about the Marquis de Sade
French prison films
1980s French-language films
1980s prison films
French Revolution films
Films set in Paris
Puppet films
Clay animation films
Surrealist films
Roland Topor
1980s stop-motion animated films
French drama films
1980s French films